Lake Cicott is an unincorporated community in Jefferson Township, Cass County, Indiana.  The community is named after the lake in which it sits beside.

It has a permanent population of 26 people.

History
Lake Cicott was laid out in 1868. The namesake of Lake Cicott is George Cicott, a pioneer. The first post office in Lake Cicott was established in 1873.

Geography
Lake Cicott is the only lake in Cass County and is the southern most glacial lake in Indiana. There are no streams feeding into it.

References

External links

Unincorporated communities in Cass County, Indiana
Unincorporated communities in Indiana
1868 establishments in Indiana
Populated places established in 1868